Tamotait is the fifth studio album by Malian group Tamikrest. It was released on March 27, 2020, under Glitterbeat.

The first single from the album, "Awnafin" was released on 10 February 2020. The Moroccan singer Hindi Zahra provided guest vocals on the track "Timtarin".

Critical reception
Tamotait was met with generally favorable reviews from critics. At Metacritic, which assigns a weighted average rating out of 100 to reviews from mainstream publications, this release received an average score of 79, based on 6 reviews.

Track listing

References

2020 albums
Glitterhouse Records albums
Desert blues albums